Kaiaf Forest Park is a forest park in the Gambia. Established on January 1, 1954, it covers 26 hectares.

The estimate terrain elevation above sea level is 20 metres.

References
  
 

Protected areas established in 1954
Forest parks of the Gambia